Woodstock Express is a steel junior roller coaster that is located at Dorney Park & Wildwater Kingdom in Allentown, Pennsylvania. It is located in Planet Snoopy in the park.

History
Woodstock Express opened and began operation on May 5, 2000 at Dorney Park & Wildwater Kingdom. This is a small roller coaster made by Zamperla. It is classified as a Family roller coaster, because you can ride it without a child, unlike a kiddie roller coaster. 

In the 2020 season, Woodstock Express celebrated its 20th anniversary.

Size
This coaster reaches a maximum height of 13 feet. There is a little over 262 feet of track and 0 inversions. This coaster always does multiple laps around the track on each ride.

Height Requirements
Guests need to be over 42 inches tall to ride unaccompanied or 36 inches tall to ride with a supervising companion.

Trains
The one train has 6 carts, each one seating 2 people. The trains are meant to be shaped like mine carts, and each train is a square.

References

External links
 Official page

Roller coasters in Pennsylvania
Roller coasters operated by Cedar Fair
Peanuts in amusement parks